Juliette Freire Feitosa (born December 3, 1989, in Campina Grande, Brazil) is a Brazilian lawyer, makeup artist, singer, television presenter and digital influencer. She became known for being the winner of the 21st season of Big Brother Brasil.

Filmography

Discography

Live Album

References 

1989 births
Living people
People from Campina Grande
21st-century Brazilian lawyers
Brazilian women lawyers
21st-century Brazilian women singers
21st-century Brazilian singers
Federal University of Paraíba alumni
Big Brother Brasil
Big Brother (franchise) winners
Big Brother (franchise) contestants
Reality show winners